Smith Summers (June 25, 1900 – death unknown), nicknamed "Tack", was an American Negro league outfielder in the 1920s.

A native of Fayetteville, Tennessee, Summers made his Negro leagues debut in 1923 with the Toledo Tigers and Chicago American Giants. He went on to play for the Negro National League's Cleveland club (known variously as the Elites, Hornets, and Tigers) from 1926 to 1928.

References

External links
 and Seamheads

1900 births
Year of death missing
Place of death missing
Chicago American Giants players
Cleveland Elites players
Cleveland Tigers (baseball) players
Cleveland Hornets players
Toledo Tigers players
Baseball players from Tennessee
People from Fayetteville, Tennessee
Baseball outfielders